The siege of Bari took place 1068–71, during the Middle Ages, when Norman forces, under the command of Robert Guiscard, laid siege to the city of Bari, a major stronghold of the Byzantines in Italy and the capital of the Catepanate of Italy, starting from 5 August 1068. Bari was captured on 16 April 1071 when Robert Guiscard entered the city, ending over five centuries of Byzantine presence in Southern Italy.

History

Background

By 1060, only a few coastal cities in Apulia were still in Byzantine hands: during the previous few decades, the Normans had increased their possessions in southern Italy and now aimed to the complete expulsion of the Byzantines from the peninsula before concentrating on  the conquest of Sicily, then mostly under Islamic domination.

Large military units were thus called from Sicily and, under Count Geoffrey of Conversano, laid siege to Otranto.

The siege
The next move was the arrival of Robert Guiscard, with a large corps, who laid siege to the Byzantine city of Bari on 5 August 1068. Within the city there were two parties: one  wanting to preserve allegiance to the Byzantine empire, and another that was pro-Norman. When the Norman troops neared, the former had prevailed and the local barons shut the city's gates and sent an embassy led by Bisantius Guirdeliku to emperor Romanos IV Diogenes in order to seek military help. The negotiations offered by Robert were refused.

Otranto fell in October, but at Bari the Norman attacks against the walls were repeatedly pushed back by the Byzantines. Robert decided to blockade the city's port with a fortified bridge in order to thwart any relief effort. The Byzantines, however, destroyed the bridge, and managed to maintain a link with their homeland.

Romanos IV named a new catepan, Avartuteles, and provided him with a fleet with men and supplies for Bari. The Byzantine fleet arrived at the city in early 1069, but in the meantime a Byzantine field army was defeated by the Normans, who occupied Gravina and Obbiano. Robert did not return immediately to Bari, and in the January 1070 he moved  to Brindisi to help the Norman forces then besieging that coastal fortress. Brindisi capitulated in the autumn of 1070.

The situation in Bari was then critical, and the population suffered from famine. Avartuteles plotted to have Robert assassinated, but the Byzantine patricius Byzantios Guideliku failed. A delegation of citizens asked the catepan to improve the city's defence, or otherwise surrender it to the Normans. Avartuteles played for time, sending another embassy to Constantinople. He obtained the arrival of a fleet with grain in Bari. When the grain ran out, a group of citizens again asked the catepan to beg the emperor to send an army as soon as possible.

Romanos IV, whose generals had been repeatedly defeated by the Normans, and with few free troops to dispatch, sent twenty ships under the command of a Gocelin, a Norman rebel who had taken shelter in Constantinople. Stephen Pateran, appointed as new catepan of Italy, came with him. However, the Normans intercepted the Byzantine ships off Bari and  scattered them. The Norman sailors identified Gocelin's ship and, despite the loss of 150 men, finally captured it; Stephen was instead able to reach Bari. He soon recognized that the defence had become impossible; a local noble, Argyritzos, was sent to negotiate with the Normans. The latter offered acceptable conditions, and Bari surrendered on April 1071.

Aftermath
Stephen Pateran was initially imprisoned, but was later allowed to return to Constantinople with other Byzantine survivors.

With the fall of Bari, the Byzantine presence in southern Italy ended after 536 years. Emperor Manuel I Komnenos tried to reconquer southern Italy in 1156-1158, but the attempt turned into a failure.

According to William of Apulia, Robert Guiscard "entrusted the city" to Argyritzos. The earliest document of Norman rule, however, shows a certain Lizius, probably a Norman, as viscount and a patrikios named Maurelianus, probably a native Bariot, as catepan.

References

Sources
 
 

1068 in Europe
1069 in Europe
1070 in Europe
1071 in Europe
1060s in the Byzantine Empire
1070s in the Byzantine Empire
Bari
Bari
Bari
Catepanate of Italy
Bari
History of Bari
Bari
Medieval Apulia
Bari